Events from the year 1617 in Quebec.

Events
Louis Hébert, his wife Marie Rollet and three children settle in Quebec. Hébert becomes the first apothecary in New France. In 1800, Hébert and his wife would already have 4592 married descendants in Quebec, making the couple one of the most important in French-Canadian ancestry.

Births

Deaths

References

1610s in Canada
Quebec, 1617 In
Years in Quebec